The 2020–21 Australian Baseball League season was the eleventh year of the Australian Baseball League (ABL) season. The Melbourne Aces won their second consecutive title by defeating the Perth Heat in a shortened playoff series.

The league was one of the many sports affected by the COVID-19 pandemic, with its traditional November start pushed back to December, multiple in-season schedule changes, fixtures reduced to 24 games and the withdrawal of Geelong-Korea and Auckland Tuatara for the season.

Teams 

On 12 November 2020, the league announced both Geelong-Korea and Auckland Tuatara had pulled out of the season for financial reasons. This breached Auckland's licensing agreement with the ABL and it was given 28 days to address the breach.

The league reverted to a six-team league for the first time since the 2017–18 Australian Baseball League season.

Regular season 
The league had originally planned a staggered 24 game schedule. Both Brisbane and Adelaide were to host week-long 'hubs' starting their season 5 January, later than everyone else, and making up games by playing doubleheaders and mid-week.

Scheduled doubleheaders consist of a seven inning game followed by a nine inning game. The league uses the WBSC tiebreaker rule for all games going beyond the 9th inning, or extra innings beginning less than one hour to a curfew.

Due to a more condensed schedule, roster limits were increased from 22 to 24, with no addition of underage development players.

The ABL roster formation points system was updated to 360 points across 24 games, with non-affiliated overseas players being worth two points, as opposed to four in previous seasons.

The season began with no state border restrictions until the first round of the season was impacted by the pandemic, with an outbreak of cases in Sydney's Northern Beaches effected both Canberra and Sydney unable to host or travel to multiple states. Sydney after playing the first two games of the season, were unable to play due to border restrictions through to 22 January.

The second round between Melbourne and Perth was also interrupted due to the previous cluster spreading to Victoria and impacting Western Australia's border closure on the state. After one game, Perth was flown out to Queensland with Canberra playing the remaining three games of the series. The Heat also replaced Melbourne's January fixtures in Brisbane. Canberra's and Melbourne's schedule was amended to play each other three consecutive rounds as the only logistical option with border closures.

A single COVID case in Queensland on 7 January saw Brisbane's hub that included the Bandits, Heat & Giants end prematurely as all three teams were flown out early to Adelaide as to not be stuck with border closures. Additional fixtures were added to be played in Adelaide to make up for some of these lost games.

Sydney was finally able to resume their season from 22 January against Canberra in Lismore, New South Wales. By playing in regional New South Wales, the Blue Sox did not have to deal with closed state borders, and Canberra did not have to enter a COVID hotspot.

The season was extended out an additional week to allow teams, namely the Blue Sox who had only played two games prior to 22 January, to play at least the benchmark of 14 games to qualify for the postseason.

Standings

Statistical leaders

Awards

Postseason
Due to changes in the regular season presented by COVID enforced state border restrictions, the playoff structure was announced mid-season to include five teams. The fourth seed hosted the fifth seed 9 February in an elimination game before the winner joined the other three top seeded teams in a single elimination playoffs 11 & 12 February.

The playoffs were originally scheduled to be a double-elimination playoffs over four days, but the host state Victoria experienced an outbreak of COVID, which forced the playoffs to be shortened to be single elimination over two days due to looming Australian state border closures. This meant a game on 12 February between the Giants and Cavalry was played with the premise of it being the losers bracket of the double elimination playoff, before it was changed to effectively a third place playoff retrospectively.

References

External links 
The Australian Baseball League – Official ABL Website
Official Baseball Australia Website

Australian Baseball League seasons
Australian Baseball League
Australian Baseball League